The Fraud (Trials Without a Jury) Bill 2007 was a proposed Act of Parliament introduced Home Secretary John Reid. Its intention was to abolish trials by jury in complex fraud cases in England, Wales and Northern Ireland by amending  section 43 of the Criminal Justice Act 2003. The Bill was given its First Reading in the House of Commons on 16 November 2006. In a highly unusual move it was blocked by the House of Lords using a delaying tactic voted on 20 March 2007.

House of Lords 
Then Conservative Shadow Lord Chancellor Lord Kingsland said:

References

External links 
 Fraud (Trials Without a Jury) Bill

2007 in British law
English criminal law
Proposed laws of the United Kingdom
Corruption in the United Kingdom
Fraud in the United Kingdom
2007 in British politics
Juries in the United Kingdom